is a railway station in the city of Chita, Aichi, Japan, operated by Meitetsu.

Lines

Station layout
The station has dual opposed side platforms connected by an underground passage. The station is staffed.

Platforms

Adjacent stations

Station history
Shin Maiko Station was opened on February 18, 1912 as a station on the Aichi Electric Railway Company. The Aichi Electric Railway became part of the Meitetsu group on August 1, 1935. The station building was reconstructed in July 1962, and replaced in July 2010. A new station building was completed in July 2010.

Passenger statistics
In fiscal 2017, the station was used by an average of 6080 passengers daily (boarding passengers only).

Surrounding area
Shinmaiko Marine Park
Japan National Route 155

See also
 List of railway stations in Japan

References

External links

 Official web page 

Railway stations in Japan opened in 1912
Railway stations in Aichi Prefecture
Stations of Nagoya Railroad
Chita, Aichi